Farniok is a surname. Notable people with the surname include:

 Matt Farniok (born 1997), American football player
 Tom Farniok (born 1991), American football player